Tropical Depression Winnie was a weak, but catastrophic tropical cyclone that killed nearly 1,600 people after triggering widespread flooding in the Philippines. It was the second deadliest tropical cyclone of 2004 worldwide, only surpassed by Atlantic Hurricane Jeanne. A depression, which formed east of Samar, brought heavy rain to areas where it passed through, and affecting many areas, owing to Winnie’s large cloudiness.

Meteorological history

Tropical Depression Winnie was first identified by the Philippine Atmospheric, Geophysical and Astronomical Services Administration on November 27 as a tropical depression east of the Philippines. A poorly organized cyclone, the Joint Typhoon Warning Center briefly issued a Tropical Cyclone Formation Alert on November 29. Tracking west-northwestward, Winnie made landfall in southern Luzon. Upon moving over land, the depression attained its peak intensity with winds of 55 km/h (35 mph) and a barometric pressure of 1000 mbar (hPa; 29.53 inHg). Once over land, the system began to weaken before entering the West Philippine Sea. Once over water, Winnie turned northwest, moving along the western Luzon coastline throughout November 29. Early on the following day, advisories on the tropical depression ceased. Winnie was last noted off the northwestern coast of Luzon, later that day.

Impact

Although a weak tropical cyclone, Tropical Depression Winnie brought torrential rainfall to much of the Visayas and Luzon. Initial estimates stated that at least 300 people were killed by the storm. However, over time, it was discovered that at least 842 people perished and 751 others were missing, a total of 1,593 people. Damage from the depression was estimated at 678.7 million Philippine pesos (US$14.6 million).

Aftermath
Not long after Winnie devastated the central Philippines, the country was struck by another, more powerful tropical cyclone. Typhoon Nanmadol worsened the situation caused by Winnie and killed another 77 people.

Retirement
Due to the extreme death toll caused by the storm in the Philippines, the name Winnie was later retired. The name was replaced with Warren.

See also

Other Philippines tropical cyclones that claimed more than 1,000 lives
Typhoon Bopha (Pablo, 2012)
Typhoon Haiyan (Yolanda, 2013), deadliest tropical cyclone to strike the Philippines in recent recorded history
Tropical Storm Washi (Sendong, 2011)
Typhoon Fengshen (Frank, 2008)
Typhoon Durian (Reming, 2006)
Tropical Storm Thelma (Uring, 1991)
1881 Haiphong Typhoon

Notes

References

External links

Western Pacific tropical depressions
2004 disasters in the Philippines
Winnie
Typhoons in the Philippines
Retired Philippine typhoon names
Winnie